The Central German Lake District (German: Mitteldeutsches Seenland) is a group of artificial lakes that are the result of extensive open pit lignite mining. The area around Leipzig is sometimes separately marketed as the "Leipzig Lake District" (German: Leipziger Seenland) or the Neuseenland. The Lausitzer und Mitteldeutsche Bergbauverwaltungsgesellschaft is in charge of the technological side of the area.

List of lakes

See also
 Leipzig River Network
 Lusatian Lake District - of similar origins

References

Artificial lakes of Germany
Regions of Saxony
Mining in Germany
Mining in Saxony